Brouwerij 't IJ (English: The IJ Brewery) is a small brewery in Amsterdam, Netherlands. It is located in a former bath house named Funen, next to the De Gooyer windmill. The brewery was opened by Kaspar Peterson, a former musician, in October 1985 and was one of several small breweries that opened in cities around the Netherlands in response to consumers' dissatisfaction with beer brewed by the larger companies. It brews twelve standard beers and three seasonal beers, besides limited edition beers.
 
The brewery allows tours and tastings, and has a pub with an outdoor terrace. It opens from 2 p.m. until 8 p.m. but no later, owing to local residents' objections to the noise. It brews in the pub basement and in a building in the nearby Zeeburgerpad. In 2019 it opened a second bar in the Blauwe Theehuis in the Vondelpark.

The brewery's logo features an ostrich, with an egg, and a distant windmill. The brewery is named after the nearby IJ waterbody.

Beers

The brewery produces twelve standard beers and three seasonal beers. The standard beers Natte, Zatte, Columbus, and Struis are certified organic.

Standard beers 
The twelve standard beers are:
 Blondie (5.8%)
 Biri (4.7%)
 Columbus (9%): amber with much hop
 Flink (4.7%)
 Free IPA (0.5%)
 I.P.A. (7%)
 IJwit (6.5%): white beer
 Natte (6.5%): a brown/red dubbel
 Session IPA (4%)
 Struis (9%): sweet and dark
 Vrijwit (0.5%)
 Zatte (8%): yellow/gold tripel

Seasonal beers 
The three seasonal beers are:
 IJbock (6,5%): dark bock beer
 Paasij (7%): amber coloured springbock
 IJndejaars (Varies per year) (9%)

References

External links 

Brouwerij 't IJ

1985 establishments in the Netherlands
Buildings and structures in Amsterdam
Tourist attractions in Amsterdam
Breweries in the Netherlands
Manufacturing companies based in Amsterdam